The Cathedral of Our Lady of Seven Sorrows, also known as the Yangjiaqiao Catholic Church, is a Catholic cathedral located in Suzhou, Jiangsu, China. It is known for its architectural hybridity between Chinese and western styles. The cathedral is located at 1162 Sanxiang Road, Suzhou.

History 
According to the Suzhou Government, the local parish started as the residence of a Catholic merchant and a gathering place for local Catholics in the Qianlong Era of the Qing Dynasty. There used to be a previous church building on the same site built in 1866 informally called "Hall of the Fishing Boats". The current church building began its construction in 1893 under the leadership of the French priest Joseph Deffond. In 1949, the Roman Catholic Diocese of Suzhou was established, and the church became the cathedral of the diocese.

In 1958, the cathedral was appropriated as a school for socialist education. It was used for other purposes in the 1960s before being returned to the Catholic Church in 1981. The cathedral suffered a flood in 1991 and became listed as a culturally protected site of Suzhou that year. In 2000, a traditional gallery and greeneries were added.

Architecture 

The cathedral building is 44.9 meters long and 29.3 meters wide. The roof ridge has a height of 10.9 meters. According to Pan et al., the cathedral employs a "hybridity" of architectural styles. The cathedral used Suzhou traditional building methods, and has a westwork in the style of a paifang. However, it has a European open timber roof structure, very similar to the one of St Nicholas Church, North Walsham. Its pillars are wooden on the inside but made of bricks on the outside.

In 1982 and 2000, the cathedral underwent renovations, in which the IHS Christogram, stained glass, icons, Corinthian capitals and stone arches were added.

See also 
List of cathedrals in China
Roman Catholic Diocese of Suzhou
Catholicism in China
Our Lady of Sorrows

References

Notes

Citations

External links 

 Yang Jiaqiao Catholic Church by Suzhou Municipal People's Government

Roman Catholic churches in Jiangsu
Roman Catholic cathedrals in China
Churches in Suzhou
1893 establishments in China